NXT TakeOver: Respect was the seventh NXT TakeOver professional wrestling livestreaming event produced by WWE. It was held exclusively for wrestlers from the promotion's developmental territory, NXT. The event aired exclusively on the WWE Network and took place on October 7, 2015, at NXT's home arena, Full Sail University in Winter Park, Florida.

Six matches were contested at the event. In the main event, Bayley defeated Sasha Banks in a 30-minute Iron Man match to retain the NXT Women's Championship, in what was the first women's match to headline a major WWE event, the first time in WWE history that a women's match had this stipulation, and the longest women's match in WWE history at the time until Banks' match against Charlotte Flair at Roadblock: End of the Line in December 2016, which was also a 30-minute Iron Man match that had sudden death overtime. The event also included the semi-finals and final of the Dusty Rhodes Tag Team Classic tournament. This was also the first TakeOver event in which the NXT Championship was not contested in the main event, and the only one until TakeOver: WarGames in November 2019 where the title was not defended whatsoever. It also marked the first WWE match of Asuka, who would go on to have the longest undefeated streak in WWE history.

Production

Background
TakeOver was a series of professional wrestling shows that began in May 2014, as WWE's then-developmental league NXT held their second WWE Network-exclusive event, billed as TakeOver. In subsequent months, the "TakeOver" moniker became the brand used by WWE for all of their NXT live specials. Respect was scheduled as the seventh NXT TakeOver event and took place on October 7, 2015, at NXT's home base of Full Sail University in Winter Park, Florida.

Storylines

The card included matches that resulted from scripted storylines, where wrestlers portrayed heroes, villains, or less distinguishable characters that built tension and culminated in a wrestling match or series of matches. Results were predetermined by WWE's writers on the NXT brand, while storylines were produced on their weekly television program, NXT.

At TakeOver: Brooklyn, Bayley defeated Sasha Banks to win her first NXT Women's Championship.  On the September 16 episode of NXT, NXT General Manager William Regal scheduled Bayley to defend her title against Banks in a 30-minute Iron Man match, to which the NXT fans chanted "Iron Woman". In addition, for the first time in NXT history, the NXT Women were put in the main event of a TakeOver special.

At TakeOver: Brooklyn, Regal also revealed that NXT would hold a tag team tournament billed as the Dusty Rhodes Tag Team Classic in honor of WWE Hall of Famer Dusty Rhodes, a longtime NXT trainer and producer, with the finals scheduled for TakeOver: Respect. The Dusty Rhodes Tag Team Classic tournament started on the September 2 episode of NXT, with the first two matches out of the 16 team tournament with Baron Corbin and Rhyno, and American Alpha (Jason Jordan and Chad Gable) moving on. The next four matches took place at several NXT live events between August 28 to September 4, however, the matches were not revealed until September 9 on WWE's YouTube channel with Amore and Cassady, The Mechanics (Dash Wilder and Scott Dawson), The Hype Bros (Zack Ryder and Mojo Rawley), and The Vaudevillains (Aiden English and Simon Gotch) moving on. The final two first round matches took place on the September 9 episode of NXT, with NXT Champion Finn Bálor and Samoa Joe, and American Alpha (Chad Gable and Jason Jordan) winning their respective matches to advance in the tournament.

Event

Preliminary matches
The event opened with the semi-finals in the Dusty Rhodes Tag Team Classic tournament. In the first semi-final, NXT Champion Finn Bálor and Samoa Joe faced The Mechanics (Dash Wilder and Scott Dawson). In the end, Joe executed a muscle buster on Wilder and Bálor executed a "Coup de Grâce" on Wilder to advance to the final.

Next, Baron Corbin and Rhyno and American Alpha (Jason Jordan and Chad Gable) competed in the second semi-final. The end came when Rhyno executed a "Gore" on Jordan. Corbin executed an "End of Days" on Gable to advance to the final.

After that, Asuka faced Dana Brooke (accompanied by Emma) in Asuka's debut. Asuka forced Dana to submit to the "Asuka Lock" to win the match.

In the fourth match, Apollo Crews faced Tyler Breeze. Crews executed a delayed spin-out powerbomb on Breeze to win the match.

In the penultimate match, Finn Bálor and Samoa Joe faced Baron Corbin and Rhyno in the final of the Dusty Rhodes Tag Team Classic tournament involving. During the match, Rhyno executed a "Gore" on Joe, but Bálor broke up the pinfall. In the end, Joe executed a muscle buster on Rhyno and Bálor executed a "Coup de Grâce" on Rhyno to win the tournament.

Main event
In the main event, Bayley defended the NXT Women's Championship against Sasha Banks in the first-ever Iron Woman match. At around eight minutes in, Banks tried to pin Bayley while using the ropes for leverage, but the referee caught her. Banks then blocked the referee's vision in the corner to poke Bayley in the eyes. Banks then rolled up Bayley to score the first point. Bayley evened the score at 1-1 after a "Bayley-to-Belly Suplex". Banks pushed Bayley into the electronic board on the entrance stage, causing her to be counted out, making the score 2-1. After Banks dominated Bayley, Bayley evened the score at 2-2 after pinning Banks with a rana. Afterwards, Bayley focused on injuring Banks' hand, but Banks sent her into the steel ring steps. Banks then performed a suicide dive on Bayley, who caught her and performed a "Bayley-to-Belly Suplex", but it resulted in a nearfall. A few minutes later, Bayley performed another "Bayley-to-Belly Suplex", this time from the middle rope, but Banks placed her foot on the rope to void the pin. In the closing moments, Bayley performed an inverted frankensteiner on Banks, who landed on her feet and followed up with her own "Bayley-to-Belly Suplex" on Bayley for a nearfall. Banks immediately applied the "Bank Statement". When Banks brought Bayley to the middle of the ring, Bayley attempted to apply the same submission on Banks, but Banks prevented it and reapplied the submission. Bayley escaped by grabbing Banks' injured hand and slamming it into the mat. Banks attempted the "Bank Statement" again, but Bayley countered and forced Banks to submit to a modified armbar. Seconds later, the match ended at a score of 3-2, resulting in Bayley winning the match and retaining the title.

Reception 
NXT TakeOver: Respect received critical acclaim. LaToya Ferguson of The A.V. Club praised the event, saying that the show shows examples of what the general audience does not get in traditional WWE pay-per-view events. There was also much praise to the main event for the NXT Women's Championship. The main event received the Meltzer rating of 4 and a quarter out of 5 stars. The match was named Match of the Year by Pro Wrestling Illustrated.

Aftermath 
After the event, Apollo Crews won a battle royal to face Finn Bálor for the NXT Championship by last eliminating Baron Corbin. On the November 4 episode of NXT, Crews won the match via disqualification when he was attacked by Corbin, thus Bálor retained.

Tyler Breeze moved to the main roster; he debuted on the October 22 episode of SmackDown, affiliating with Summer Rae and attacking Dolph Ziggler.

Meanwhile, Bayley began feuding with Alexa Bliss, while Emma and Dana Brooke continued their feud with Asuka, leading to a match at NXT TakeOver: London.

Results

Iron Man match

Tournament bracket

References 

Respect
2015 WWE Network events
2015 in professional wrestling in Florida
Events in Florida
Professional wrestling in Winter Park, Florida
October 2015 events in the United States